Bollebygds IF is a Swedish football club located in Bollebygd in Bollebygd Municipality, Västra Götaland County.

Background
Bollebygds Idrottsförening is a sports club in Bollebygd that was formed in 1907.  The club has specialised in football, athletics and gymnastics.

Since their foundation Bollebygds IF has participated mainly in the lower divisions of the Swedish football league system.  The club currently plays in Division 3 Mellersta Götaland which is the fifth tier of Swedish football. They play their home matches at the Björnskogsvallen in Bollebygd.

Bollebygds IF are affiliated to the Västergötlands Fotbollförbund.

The most famous football player who has played for Bollebygds IF is Glenn Martindahl who won the Allsvenskan play-off with Örgryte IS in 1985.

Season to season

Attendances

In recent seasons Bollebygds IF have had the following average attendances:

Footnotes

External links
 Bollebygds IF – Official website
 Bollebygds IF – Football team website

Sport in Västra Götaland County
Football clubs in Västra Götaland County
Association football clubs established in 1907
1907 establishments in Sweden